Cehennem Deresi Canyon (literally: Hell's Creek Canyon) is a canyon in  Artvin Province, northeastern Turkey. It is among the  country's longest canyons.

It is one of the country's biggest canyons, and is among the deepest of its kind in the world. The entrance section of the canton is narrower than the rest. The canyon walls are quite steep. In the area of karstic terrain, geological formations like caves and sinkholes are found.

It is planned that this protected area of first degree will be declared a nature park, where various outdoor activities will be offered. The project is financially supported by the Eastern Blacksea Development Agency (DOKA) with about  781,000 (approx. US$ 145,000). A glass-floor bridge of about  length and  width is being constructed to connect the two rims of the canyon.

References

Canyons and gorges of Turkey
Landforms of Artvin Province
Tourist attractions in Artvin Province